Safia is an Australian electronica, indie pop band formed in Canberra. They have released two studio albums.

Career
Safia won the Groovin' the Moo competition in 2012. The band says the name comes from a song they wrote called "Sapphire", but it does not mean anything. The band have since found out that safia means serenity in Arabic.

When it comes to the band's influences, they claim to have a very broad range of styles and genres but list artists like Purity Ring, Major Lazer, Feed Me, Chet Faker, Disclosure and James Blake.

In 2014, they were featured on Peking Duk's ARIA top 10 single, "Take Me Over".

Also in 2014, lead singer Ben Woolner appeared as feature artist on the Indian Summer single "Aged Care" under the pseudonym 'Benjamin Joseph'. The band opened for Twenty One Pilots during their 2017 Emotional Roadshow Tour Pacific Leg which started in Wellington, New Zealand.

On 30 June 2016, the band announced the title of its debut album, Internal, which was released on 9 September 2016 and peaked at number 2 on the ARIA Charts. On 13 October 2017, Safia released "Cellophane Rainbow".

In 2018, they released "Freakin' Out", which was the first track they wrote after their album Internal.

The band released their second album, Story's Start or End in September 2019. The album peaked at number 13 on the ARIA charts.

In October 2022, the band released "Falling Down", the first release since their second album Story's Start or End in 2019.

Band members
 Ben Woolner (also uses the pseudonym "Benjamin Joseph") – vocals/producer
 Michael Bell – drums/producer
 Harry Sayers – guitars/synths/producer

Discography

Studio albums

Singles

As lead artist

 In 2015, Safia signed with Parlophone. From "Embracing Me", their songs are ineligible for the Australian Indie chart.

As featured artist

Other appearances

Music videos

Awards and nominations

AIR Awards
The Australian Independent Record Awards (commonly known informally as AIR Awards) is an annual awards night to recognise, promote and celebrate the success of Australia's Independent Music sector.

|-
| AIR Awards of 2014 || "Paranoia, Ghosts & Other Sounds" || Best Independent Dance, Electronica or Club Single||

ARIA Music Awards
Since 1987 the ARIA Music Awards have run annual awards.

APRA Awards 
Since 1982 the APRA Awards are run by Australian Performing Right Association to recognise songwriting skills, sales and airplay performance by its members annually.

J Award
The J Awards are an annual series of Australian music awards that were established by the Australian Broadcasting Corporation's youth-focused radio station Triple J. They commenced in 2005.

|-
| J Awards of 2013
|themselves
| Unearthed Artist of the Year
| 
|-
| J Awards of 2016
| Internal
| Australian Album of the Year
|

National Live Music Awards
The National Live Music Awards (NLMAs) are a broad recognition of Australia's diverse live industry, celebrating the success of the Australian live scene. The awards commenced in 2016.

|-
| National Live Music Awards of 2016
| Themselves
| Live Electronic Act (or DJ) of the Year
|

References

External links
 

APRA Award winners
Australian indie pop groups
Australian Capital Territory musical groups
Australian electronic musicians
Musical groups established in 2009